Seltso-Ryabovo is a rural locality (a village) in Yugskoye Rural Settlement, Cherepovetsky District, Vologda Oblast, Russia. The population was 5 as of 2002.

Geography 
Seltso-Ryabovo is located 46 km southeast of Cherepovets (the district's administrative centre) by road. Ryabovo is the nearest rural locality.

References 

Rural localities in Cherepovetsky District